Sharpe's Rifles is the first of the Sharpe television dramas, based on Bernard Cornwell's 1988 novel of the same name.  Shown on ITV in 1993, the adaptation stars Sean Bean, Daragh O'Malley and Assumpta Serna.  It began a long series of successful and critically acclaimed television adaptations of the novels.

The drama tells the story of Richard Sharpe, an ambitious and hardened soldier from Yorkshire. The story follows the exploits of Sharpe and his band of chosen men through Spain after they survive an ambush by French cavalry.

Filming took place in the Crimea, Portugal and England, during which Paul McGann who was the original actor cast for the role of Richard Sharpe, broke his leg and was quickly replaced with Sean Bean.

Plot summary
In 1809, Sergeant Richard Sharpe (Sean Bean) of the 95th Rifles saves Sir Arthur Wellesley, the commander of the British army fighting the French in Portugal, from three French cavalrymen. Wellesley rewards Sharpe with a field commission to lieutenant.

Wellesley has no money to pay his men, so he has arranged for a loan from the Rothschild family. James Rothschild has set out from Vienna with a badly needed bank draft, but has gone missing in the Spanish mountains. A company of the 95th, under Major Dunnett, is being sent to search for him, and Sharpe's first assignment is to command the Chosen Men, a handful of sharpshooters attached to the company.  Sharpe, still uncomfortable in his new rank, does not make a good impression on his men, particularly their unofficial leader, Irishman Patrick Harper.

While Sharpe and his men are out scouting the terrain, the company is surprised and wiped out by enemy cavalry led by Colonel de L'Eclin and a man in dark civilian clothes, with only the young Rifleman Perkins and a gravely wounded Captain Murray, the company's executive officer, surviving. Sharpe's men and the survivors hide in a barn, where Murray dies after gifting Sharpe his sword.

Harper tells Sharpe that he and the men have decided to return to the army, against orders. To assert his authority, Sharpe engages Harper in a brutal fistfight, but they are interrupted by a band of Spanish guerrillas led by Commandante Teresa Moreno and Major Blas Vivar. Sharpe declares Harper a mutineer and joins forces with the Spanish guerrillas for mutual protection, since they are headed in the same general direction. Sharpe begins to bond with his men and also with Teresa. The guerrillas are protecting a chest; when Harper kills two French cavalrymen to save it, Sharpe drops the mutiny charge. Along the way, they encounter the Parkers, a Methodist missionary couple and their niece, whom they take under their protection.

Vivar claims the chest contains important government documents, but Sharpe opens it and finds the Gonfalon of Santiago or "Banner of Blood". Legend has it that Santiago (Saint James) himself will appear to defend Spain when the flag is raised over the chapel in the town of Torrecastro.  Major Hogan, Wellesley's chief of military intelligence, shows up and orders Sharpe to assist Vivar with his mission, saying their belief in a flag is no different from his fighting in the army, for Britain. On the eve of the attack, Sharpe promotes Harper to sergeant.

Sharpe, Teresa, Vivar and their men attack and defeat the French garrison. Vivar crosses swords with the man in black, who turns out to be his own brother, and kills him. He then raises the flag. At the end of the battle, Colonel de L'Eclin is about to shoot an unarmed Sharpe, but is shot and killed by Perkins. Sharpe rewards him by making him a Chosen Man, though Hogan advises Perkins to decline the favour.

Sharpe reports back to Wellesley. When the general expresses his disappointment that Sharpe did not find Rothschild, Sharpe reveals that "Mrs. Parker" is the banker in disguise, to Wellesley's delight. Afterwards, Sharpe and Teresa make love, before she leaves to continue fighting the French.

Cast
 Sean Bean as Sergeant/Lieutenant Richard Sharpe
 Daragh O'Malley as Rifleman/Sergeant Patrick Harper
 Assumpta Serna as Comandante Teresa Moreno
 Brian Cox as Major Michael Hogan
 David Troughton as Sir Arthur Wellesley
 Simón Andreu as Major Blas Vivar
 Anthony Hyde as Count of Matamoros
 Malcolm Jamieson as Colonel de L'Eclin 
 Michael Mears as Rifleman Francis Cooper
 John Tams as Rifleman Daniel Hagman
 Jason Salkey as Rifleman Harris
 Lyndon Davies as Rifleman Ben Perkins
 Paul Trussell as Rifleman Isaiah Tongue
 Julian Fellowes as Major Dunnett
 Richard Ireson as Sgt. Williams
 Jack McKenzie as Mr. Parker
 Tim Bentinck as Captain Murray
 Kerry Shale  as James Rothschild

See also
 95th Regiment of Foot
 Over the Hills and Far Away (traditional song)
 Sharpe's Rifles (novel)
 Sharpe (TV series)

References

External links
 

1993 British television episodes
1990s historical films
1990s war films
Films based on British novels
Films based on historical novels
Films based on military novels
Rifles
Napoleonic Wars films
Films shot in Ukraine
War television films
Fiction set in 1809
Films directed by Tom Clegg (director)